Netscape Navigator 2 was a proprietary web browser released by Netscape Communications Corporation as its flagship product. Versions were available for Microsoft Windows, Apple Macintosh, Linux, IRIX, HP-UX, AIX, Solaris, SunOS, JavaOS, and FreeBSD.

The browser introduced and improved a number of features and also added proprietary extensions to the HTML standard. Notably, Netscape 2 was the first browser to support JavaScript and animated gifs, two technologies still predominant on the web today.

Features
The browser introduced many new or improved features:

 Support for progressive JPEGs (previous versions supported only the baseline format)
 Support for GIF89a (previous versions supported only GIF87a)
 Support for client-side image maps (previous versions supported only server-side image maps)
 Support for plugins (previous versions supported only helper applications)
 Improved bookmark organization
 Added support for FTP uploading
 Added support for LiveScript (now known as JavaScript)
 Added OLE support
 Added support for HTML frames
 Introduced Netscape Mail and Netscape News, an e-mail client and Usenet News reader, respectively

Netscape Now

To promote Netscape Navigator, Netscape developed the "Netscape Now" program. The program promoted the display of the "Netscape Now! 2.0" web badge on websites with newly supported features, including frames, live objects, Java applets, and JavaScript.

Popular plugins
The support for plugins led to the development of a number of popular plugins to extend Navigator's functionality.

 Acrobat Amber - Released in early 1996 by Adobe Systems, it allowed for a pdf to be streamed.
 Lightning Strike - Released by Inifinet, it offered non-standard real-time wavelet compression
 RealAudio Player
 MovieStar - Released by Intelligence at Large, it offered streaming of QuickTime videos (as there wasn't a QuickTime plugin yet)
 Macromedia Shockwave Player
 Netcloak

Easter eggs
Netscape had several easter eggs. Navigator 2 featured verse 12:10 from The Book of Mozilla.

The bottom of "about:authors" read:

References

Books

External links
 Netscape Navigator 2.0 in Web Design Museum
 Netscape Navigator 2 Plugins
 Netscape Navigator 2 Download

Gopher clients
Netscape
Windows web browsers
Discontinued web browsers